The Altamont School, located in Birmingham, Alabama atop Red Mountain, is a college preparatory day school with coeducational enrollment of grades 5–12. Most of the students live in Birmingham and the surrounding communities.

History
Altamont was established in 1975 as a merger between the Brooke Hill School, a college preparatory school for girls founded in 1940, and the Birmingham University School, a boys' school founded in 1922 by Basil M. Parks.

Cecil F. Stodghill, Jr. was named Head of School in 2022.

Campus
The main school building houses forty classrooms, two science wings, a fine arts center, a student center, an art gallery and sculpture garden, a computer lab, a 20,000-volume library, and special studios for chorus, art, photography, and orchestra. An audio-visual recording studio was recently added to the fine arts suite. The athletic facilities include two gymnasiums with two basketball courts, three volleyball courts and a weight room. The main campus offers six tennis courts, a soccer field and a track. A second campus provides another gymnasium as well as soccer, baseball, and softball fields.

Students, faculty, and administration
Approximately 80% of Altamont graduates matriculate to out-of-state colleges and universities. A total of 14% of the students in the Class of 2008 were named National Merit semifinalists, the highest percentage of a school in the state. The faculty consists of 54 teachers, of whom nearly three quarters hold master's degrees or higher.  Altamont is governed by a Board of Trustees. The school is accredited by the Southern Association of Colleges and Schools.

Athletics
As of 2005 the girls track and cross country teams had won the state title for 14 years straight. Altamont boys track won the outdoor title in 2006 and the indoor in 2004 and 2005. The girls soccer team have won State Titles in 2004, 2006, and 2007. The boys team won in 2003, 2008, and 2012.

Notable alumni
 William J. Cabaniss, former ambassador to the Czech Republic 
 Rebecca Gilman, Evening Standard Award winning playwright and Pulitzer Prize finalist 
 Kate Jackson, actress 
 Diane McWhorter, Pulitzer Prize-winning author 
 Wayne Rogers, actor 
 Warren St. John, reporter for The New York Times, author of Rammer Jammer Yellowhammer 
 Margaret Tutwiler, former ambassador to Morocco and former undersecretary for Public Diplomacy and Public Affairs, U.S. State Department 
 Daniel Wallace, author of Big Fish 
 Harry Miree, Grammy-nominated musician

References

External links
The Altamont School

1975 establishments in Alabama
Educational institutions established in 1975
1922 establishments in Alabama
Educational institutions established in 1922
High schools in Birmingham, Alabama
Schools in Jefferson County, Alabama
Private high schools in Alabama
Private middle schools in Alabama
Preparatory schools in Alabama